Raphael Holzhauser (born 16 February 1993) is an Austrian professional footballer who plays as an attacking midfielder for TSV 1860 Munich, on loan from Belgian First Division A club OH Leuven, and the Austria national team.

Club career
Holzhauser was born in Wiener Neustadt, Austria. Before the 2010–11 season, he joined Stuttgart's second team, playing in the 3. Liga. On 21 January 2012, he made his Bundesliga debut for VfB Stuttgart against Schalke.

On 1 July 2013, Holzhauser was loaned out to fellow Bundesliga side FC Augsburg until June 2014.

After his return from Augsburg, he was excluded from the first team squad and had to play for the reserve team in 3. Liga for the first half of the 2014–15 campaign. In total he made 77 matches for VfB Stuttgart II and finally moved to Austria Wien on 22 January 2015.

In May 2018, with Holzhauser's Austria Wien contract running out, it was announced Holzhauser would join Swiss Super League side Grasshopper Club Zürich on a free transfer for the 2018–19 season. He agreed a two-year deal with Grasshoppers. On 2 April 2019, it was confirmed, that Holzhauser's contract had been terminated by mutual consent.

On 19 June 2019, Holzhauser signed a two-year contract with Belgian club Beerschot.

International career
Holzhauser was also a member of the several Austrian national youth football teams. He debuted with the senior Austria national team in a friendly 2–1 win over Greece on 7 October 2020.

Career statistics

Club

International

References

External links

Raphael Holzhauser at VfB-Stuttgart.de 

1993 births
Living people
Sportspeople from Wiener Neustadt
Footballers from Lower Austria
Austrian footballers
Association football midfielders
Austria international footballers
Austria under-21 international footballers
Austria youth international footballers
VfB Stuttgart II players
VfB Stuttgart players
FC Augsburg players
FK Austria Wien players
Grasshopper Club Zürich players
K Beerschot VA players
Oud-Heverlee Leuven players
TSV 1860 Munich players
Bundesliga players
3. Liga players
Austrian Football Bundesliga players
Swiss Super League players
Belgian Pro League players
Challenger Pro League players
Austrian expatriate footballers
Austrian expatriate sportspeople in Germany
Expatriate footballers in Germany
Austrian expatriate sportspeople in Belgium
Expatriate footballers in Belgium